Raffaele Molin (27 October 1825 – 29 June 1887) was an Italian scientist with successful career as physician, zoologist, geologist. He is most revered for his works in ichthyology and parasitology. He is immortalised as the authority of a number of parasitic worms.

He was born in Zadar on 27 October 1825. His father was Ferdinand Astolfi and mother Margaret Trevisani. He studied medicine at the University of Vienna, from where he graduated in 1849. In 1851, shortly after the retirement of professor TA Catullus, he was appointed by the Austrian Government to be the successor as professor of natural sciences at the University of Padua. He started dual teaching in zoology and mineralogy on 4 February 1852. From 1856 he began to devote himself to research in ichthyology.

On 13 January 1856 he was elected as member of the Academy of Sciences, Letters and Arts in Padua. His research work centred at the provinces of Vienna, where he made his first contribution in helminthology. In 1858 he described for the first time a chicken parasite Capillaria annulata. Eventually in the spring of 1866, he moved to Vienna.  In 1867, he was appointed by the Government of Vienna as professor of applied zoology at the Imperial-Royal Polytechnic Institute (now Vienna University of Technology). However, he remained there only up to January 1875. In 1878, he obtained the professional license as practitioner physician. He even opened free clinic for the poor two days a week. From 1885 to 1887 he taught as a lecturer at the Vienna College of Agriculture, while maintaining a hobby of breeding of pets and aquatic animals.

He died in Vienna on 29 June 1887.

References

External links
Wikispecies
DIZIONARIO BIOGRAFICO DEGLI ITALIANI
Books at Barnes&Noble
Publications at Google Books
Books at Amazon
books at AbeBooks
Publications at WorldCat

Italian biologists
Italian parasitologists
19th-century Italian physicians
University of Vienna alumni
Academic staff of the University of Padua
1825 births
1887 deaths